Ba Đình is one of the four original urban districts (quận) of Hanoi, the capital city of Vietnam. The district currently has 14 wards, covering a total area of 9.21 square kilometers. As of 2019, there were 221,893 people residing in the district, the population density is 24,000 inhabitants per square kilometer.

Ba Đình district has a large number of monuments, landmarks and relics, including Ho Chi Minh Mausoleum, One Pillar Pagoda, Flag Tower of Hanoi and Imperial Citadel of Thăng Long, a UNESCO World Heritage Site.

Ba Đình is the political center of Vietnam. Most of the government offices and embassies are located here. It was formerly called the "French Quarter" (Khu phố Pháp) because of a high concentration of French-styled villas and government buildings built when Hanoi was the capital of French Indochina. This name is still used in travel literature. The southern half of Hoàn Kiếm district is also called the "French Quarter", also because of numerous French-styled buildings, most of which are now used as foreign embassies.

The wreckage of a B-52 bomber shot down during the Vietnam War can be seen in Hữu Tiệp Lake in the Ngọc Hà neighborhood.

History 

One of the oldest remaining structures in the neighborhood is the One Pillar Pagoda, built under the Lý dynasty. In 1901, the Presidential Palace was built. On September 2, 1945, Ho Chi Minh read the Declaration of Independence at Ba Dinh Square to approximately 500,000 people. Following his death in 1969, the preserved body of Ho Chi Minh was put on display in the Hồ Chí Minh Mausoleum, located in Ba Dinh Square, in 1975.

Location 

Ba Đình is located at 21° 2′ 12″ N, 105° 50′ 10″ E, in the center of Hanoi. It's surrounded to the north by Tây Hồ, to the east by the Red River, to the south by Đống Đa, to the southeast by Hoàn Kiếm and to the west by Cầu Giấy.

Administrative divisions 
The district contains 14 wards (phường)

Education

International schools:
 Hanoi International School
 Singapore International School in the Vạn Phúc Diplomatic Compound

Gallery

References

Districts of Hanoi
Quarters (urban subdivision)